Antonio Piva (8 April 1942 – 3 November 2022) was an Italian businessman and politician. A member of Forza Italia, he served in the Chamber of Deputies from 1994 to 2001.

Piva died on 3 November 2022, at the age of 80.

References

1942 births
2022 deaths
Italian businesspeople
Deputies of Legislature XII of Italy
Deputies of Legislature XIII of Italy
Forza Italia politicians
Politicians from the Province of Padua